Kharil (also Romanized as Kharīl and Khoril’; also known as Khowrīl) is a village in Misheh Pareh Rural District, in the Central District of Kaleybar County, East Azerbaijan Province, Iran. At the 2006 census, its population was 96, in 20 families.

References 

Populated places in Kaleybar County